In military terms, 102nd Division or 102nd Infantry Division may refer to:

 102nd Division (1st Formation) (People's Republic of China), 1949–1950
 102nd Division (2nd Formation)(People's Republic of China), 1950–1955
 102nd Fortress Division (France)
 102nd Infantry Division (Wehrmacht)
 102nd Motorised Division Trento, a unit of the Italian Army during World War II
 102nd Division (Imperial Japanese Army), a component of the Thirty-Fifth Army (Japan)
 102nd Division (Philippines)
 102nd Rifle Division, an infantry division of the Red Army during World War II

 102nd Infantry Division (United States)

sl:Seznam divizij po zaporednih številkah (100. - 149.)#102. divizija